Hugh Ray Easton (26 November 1906 – 15 August 1965) was an English stained-glass artist. His workshop was in Cambridge.

Biography
Hugh Easton was born in London, son of Frank (a doctor) and Alice ( Howland).  He studied in France and worked for the firm of Blacking in Surrey before setting up a studio in Cambridge. During the Second World War he served at the Ministry of Information with the rank of commander in the Royal Naval Volunteer Reserve (RNVR). Most of his windows were made in Harpenden at the studio of Robert Hendra and Geoffrey Harper. He and his associates worked on many windows for churches and other institutions after the war. He was the designer of a memorial window in the Battle of Britain Chapel in Westminster Abbey.

Many of his windows contain his 'weathervane' signature, e.g. East window, South Aisle, St Mary the Virgin church, Burwell, Cambridgeshire.

Easton died on 15 August 1965 at the King Edward VII Hospital for Officers, London. A memorial service was held in the Henry VII Chapel at Westminster Abbey on 24 September 1965.

Notable works

 Durham Cathedral, County Durham
 All Saints' Church, Hockerill, Bishop's Stortford
 St Andrew's Church, Ham, London
 St Elphin's Church, Warrington
 Holy Trinity Church, Coventry
 Church of St Paul's in King Cross, West Yorkshire
 The Barn Church, Kew, London Borough of Richmond upon Thames
 St Peter upon Cornhill, City of London 
 St Edward the Confessor Church in Sutton Place, Guildford
 St Mary The Virgin, Burwell, Cambridgeshire
 Westcliff High School for Girls, Essex
 Rolls-Royce Battle of Britain Memorial Window, Derby
 Dutch Church, Austin Friars, London
 St John the Divine's Church, Morecambe, a large west window featuring the Four Horsemen of the Apocalypse

See also
 Gerald Coles

References

External link

1906 births
1965 deaths
Artists from London
English stained glass artists and manufacturers 
Military personnel from London
People educated at Wellington College, Berkshire
Royal Naval Volunteer Reserve personnel of World War II
Royal Navy officers of World War II
University of Tours alumni